Prince Alexander Mikhailovich Golitsyn ( – ) - was a Russian envoy to Great Britain, Vice-Chancellor, representative of the younger branch of the House of Golitsyn. Full Privy Councillor, senator, and Chief Chamberlain.

Biography

In 1742, he began serving at the Russian Embassy in Holland. In 1749, he was on a brief unofficial mission to  Paris, as part of the Austrian Embassy; in 1755-1761, he was an envoy to London and became involved in the Seven Years' War. He contributed to the accession to the throne of Catherine II of Russia. During the June coup of 1762, Golitsyn was sent to Peter III of Russia who wrote to Catherine a letter in which the emperor "asked for a pardon" and permission to retire in a foreign country, but died within a few days in Ropsha on his estate Ropshinsky under unclear circumstances. Emperor Paul I of Russia was convinced that his father was forcibly deprived of life, but he apparently could not find any evidence of this. Grigory Teplov is named as one of the murderers.

From 9 June 1762 to 2 April 1775 — Vice-Chancellor, Vice-President, member of the Collegium of Foreign Affairs, Knight of the Order of Alexander Nevsky (1762). Since 1764 — full Privy Councillor. In 1774, he received the Order of St. Andrew and became a senator; Chief Chamberlain (1775).

In 1764 he was involved in the collection of paintings Catharina received from Johann Ernst Gotzkowsky. which is regarded as the birth of Hermitage Museum. In 1771 he collaborated with his cousin Dmitri Alekseyevich Gallitzin in The Hague to acquire rare paintings after the death of Gerrit Braamcamp, but the valuable cargo on board of Vrouw Maria got lost near the coast of Finland in a storm. As Vice-chancellor for more than a decade, he did not enjoy the Empress's favor. Interested mainly in the external side of diplomatic relations, Golitsyn had no influence on affairs; the head of Russian politics was Panin. Foreigners did not rate Prince Golitsyn's abilities very highly, but they noted that he always stood outside the parties and avoided intrigues. According to the British envoy, he "confused rather than helped, even in the trifles to which he was allowed".

In 1778, he retired and lived in Moscow, doing charitable work. He was a Honorary Guardian of the Moscow Foster home and a trustee of Pavlovsk Hospital. He ordered to build , using the capital of his late cousin Prince Dmitry Mikhailovich Golitsyn the Younger. He enjoyed the attention and favor of the emperors Paul I of Russia and Alexander I of Russia and especially Maria Feodorovna.

Golitsyn was a lover of the arts, and did much to decorate the estate . He collected a whole museum of rare paintings and sculptures. Considering that his collection would be useful to the fatherland, he bequeathed it to the Golitsyn Hospital for eternal storage so that it would not be fragmented.

In 1809, his nephew, S.M. Golitsyn, completed the building that was built on the territory of the hospital by A.M. Golitsyn in 1803 to house an art gallery. It was the first Moscow public gallery of Western European art that exhibited 477 paintings, as well as statues and vases. The gallery lasted until 1817, when its exhibits were sold at auctions.

He was buried in the Church of St. Demetrius at the Golitsyn Hospital.

References

1723 births
1807 deaths
Active Privy Councillor (Russian Empire)
Ambassadors of the Russian Empire to the United Kingdom
Alexander
Senators of the Russian Empire
Russian princes